, formerly the  is one of the sections of the Tokyo Stock Exchange. It was formerly an independent stock exchange.

JASDAQ is not related to NASDAQ in the United States, but has operated an electronic trading system similar to NASDAQ.

History

In 1963, the  set up an over-the-counter registration system for trading securities. This system was placed under the management of a private company,  in 1976.

The JASDAQ automated quotation system became operational in 1991.

In 2004, JASDAQ received a permit from the Prime Minister to reorganize as a securities exchange. It became the first new securities exchange in Japan in almost fifty years.

On April 1, 2010, the Osaka Securities Exchange acquired the JASDAQ Securities Exchange, and merged it with OSE's NEO and Nippon New Market-Hercules markets to form the "new" JASDAQ market.

Hours
The exchange has pre-market sessions from 08:00am to 09:00am and normal trading sessions from 09:00am to 03:00pm on all days of the week except Saturdays, Sundays and holidays declared by the Exchange in advance.

See also
 List of East Asian stock exchanges
 List of stock exchanges

References

External links
OSE JASDAQ Market

Stock exchanges in Japan
Defunct stock exchanges
2010 mergers and acquisitions